Hot News is a 1928 American silent comedy film produced and distributed by Paramount Famous Lasky Corporation, an amalgamation of Famous Players-Lasky and Paramount Pictures. Clarence Badger directed and Bebe Daniels starred.

Cast
Bebe Daniels as Pat Clancy
Neil Hamilton as Scoop Morgan
Paul Lukas as James Clayton
Alfred Allen as Michael Clancy
Spec O'Donnell as Spec
Ben Hall as Benny
Mario Carillo as Maharajah
Maude Turner Gordon as Mrs. Van Vleck
Guy Oliver as uncredited

Preservation status
The film is now considered lost.

References

External links

Newspaper advertisement

American silent feature films
Lost American films
Films directed by Clarence G. Badger
Paramount Pictures films
1928 comedy films
Silent American comedy films
American black-and-white films
Lost comedy films
1928 lost films
Films with screenplays by Florence Ryerson
1920s American films
1920s English-language films